William Makin (27 September 1883 – 11 January 1962) was an Australian cricketer. He played two first-class matches for New South Wales in 1910/11.

See also
 List of New South Wales representative cricketers

References

External links
 

1883 births
1962 deaths
Australian cricketers
New South Wales cricketers
Cricketers from Bolton